ABB Arena, formerly known as Hillängens IP, is a football stadium in Ludvika, Sweden  and the home stadium for the football team Ludvika FK.

References 

Football venues in Sweden